Păcureți is a commune in Prahova County, Muntenia, Romania. It is composed of five villages: Bărzila, Curmătura, Matița, Păcureți and Slavu.

References

Communes in Prahova County
Localities in Muntenia